Darreh Geru or Darreh Gerow, also rendered as Darreh Geruh or Darreh Goruh, may refer to:
 Darreh Gerow Chong
 Darreh Geru-ye Olya
 Darreh Geru-ye Sofla